Alberto de la Bella Madueño (born 2 December 1985) is a Spanish former professional footballer who played as a left-back.

He spent the majority of his professional career with Real Sociedad, playing 218 competitive games for the club.

Club career
Born in Santa Coloma de Gramenet, Barcelona, Catalonia, de la Bella started his career at local UDA Gramenet. Other than with this club, he only represented B teams in various parts of the country in four seasons, on loan and after being released (in 2008–09, he played with Sevilla FC's reserves in the Segunda División, being relegated).

In the summer of 2009, de la Bella signed with Real Sociedad in the same level, as a replacement for Athletic Bilbao-bound Xabi Castillo. He was also first choice during the league campaign, but achieved La Liga promotion this time, as champions.

De la Bella made his debut in the Spanish top flight on 29 August 2010, featuring the full 90 minutes in a 1–0 home win against Villarreal CF. In early May 2014, he renewed his contract with the Txuriurdin until 2018.

De la Bella played second-fiddle to Yuri Berchiche in 2015–16, appearing in only 16 competitive games. On 5 July 2016, he was loaned to Olympiacos F.C. for two years. The following 23 April, he scored his only two goals of the season to help his team defeat PAS Giannina F.C. 5–0 and clinch their seventh consecutive Super League Greece title.

On 27 July 2017, after being told he was not part of new manager Besnik Hasi's plans, de la Bella decided to return to Real Sociedad. On 27 August 2018, after nine years at the Anoeta, he joined second-tier club UD Las Palmas on a two-year deal with an option for a third.

On 10 September 2020, de la Bella was loaned to fellow second-division side FC Cartagena for the season. Having played over 20 games and avoided relegation, he was rewarded with a permanent contract for the following year.

De la Bella announced his retirement from professional football on 17 May 2022, at the age of 36.

International career
Uncapped by Spain at any level, de la Bella was first called up to the unofficial Catalonia team in December 2010, for the Catalonia International Trophy against Honduras. He started in the 4–0 win at the Estadi Olímpic Lluís Companys on 28 December.

Honours
Real Sociedad
Segunda División: 2009–10

Olympiacos
Super League Greece: 2016–17

References

External links

1985 births
Living people
People from Santa Coloma de Gramenet
Sportspeople from the Province of Barcelona
Spanish footballers
Footballers from Catalonia
Association football defenders
La Liga players
Segunda División players
Segunda División B players
Tercera División players
UDA Gramenet footballers
RCD Espanyol B footballers
Villarreal CF B players
Sevilla Atlético players
Real Sociedad footballers
UD Las Palmas players
FC Cartagena footballers
Super League Greece players
Olympiacos F.C. players
Catalonia international footballers
Spanish expatriate footballers
Expatriate footballers in Greece
Spanish expatriate sportspeople in Greece